Burnet v. Sanford & Brooks Co., 282 U.S. 359 (1931), was a case heard before the United States Supreme Court dealing with accounting for purposes of federal income tax and the Sixteenth Amendment to the United States Constitution. The case held that an annual accounting system is a practical necessity if the federal income tax is to produce revenue ascertainable and payable at regular intervals.

The case was decided at a time when losses could not be carried forward to future years. Since 2018, Section 172 of the Internal Revenue Code now generally allows a taxpayer to use net operating losses from previous years to deduct up to 80% of income for a given year.

References

External links

United States Sixteenth Amendment case law
United States taxation and revenue case law
United States Supreme Court cases
United States Supreme Court cases of the Hughes Court
1931 in United States case law